The Instituto Cubano del Arte e Industria Cinematográficos (ICAIC, Cuban Institute of Cinematographic Art and Industry) was established by the Cuban government in March 1959 after the Cuban Revolution. Its prominent members are Tomás Gutiérrez Alea, Julio García Espinosa, Alfredo Guevara and Santiago Álvarez.

The ICAIC is an organization of a film industry to produce, distribute and exhibit films and related work following the Cuban Revolution. Its aim is to use film as a powerful mass communication medium to mobilize and educate people, improve the quality level of Cuba films with appreciation among the masses and reach a wide public. Through educating the new generation of young directors, one of its responsibilities is to transform Cuba from a country of cinematic consumption to a production.

History of the ICAIC

The creation of the ICAIC

Following the success of the Cuban Revolution in 1959, the new Cuban government viewed the film industry as an instrument of social change. Cuba prioritized film as a communications strategy to build revolutionary culture. The Cuban government invested substantial funds for public investment in both film production and film exhibition. These efforts led to the creation of the Cuban Institute of Cinematographic Art and Industry (ICAIC). Under the conception of ICAIC “cinema is an art”, and cinema constitutes “an instrument of opinion and formation of individual and collective consciousness”.

In the 1960s

Due to some institutions establishing before ICAIC, they organized workshops to train technicians. These institutions include Film Department at Havana University, Sociedad Cultural "Nuestro Tiempo" (Cultural Society "Our Times") and Catholic Center of Cinematographic Orientation (CCOC). Therefore, Cuba's film industry did not lack of skilled technicians, but it lacked experienced directors. Tomás Gutiérrez Alea and Julio García Espinosa were the only two main directors in Cuba in the 1960s, so the international program for educating young directors became indispensable. ICAIC sent trainee directors to work as assistants in France, Italy, East Germany, and elsewhere. Working as an assistant can help understand the whole process of filmmaking. And the basic filmmaking skill is very useful when they become directors in the future.

In 1960, Cine Cubano, the ICAIC’s film journal, is published. It includes films, interviews, filmographies, and movie plots. They put education into powerful words. Cine Cubano invites all people to submit their writings and share their opinions to the films, as well as teach their critical thinking. Beyond subsidies by the government, ICAIC receives a lot of sponsorships from Cine Cubano. Thanks to these sponsorships, the ICAIC have money on financing films, training filmmakers and educating audiences.

Due to the U.S. monopolization, ICAIC only produced about eight or nine features in a year  This was not healthy to the Cuban film industry. After that, the US trade embargo made the Hollywood films become less accessible to Cuba. To Cuban cinema, it was about time to explore something new from other countries and not rely on the U.S. production. To keep Cuba's theaters going, the ICAIC imported a large number of movies from France, Italy, Japan and other countries, which creates a great diversity. For audiences, it is a great chance to know more different cultures from movies, and then they can enhance the culture exchange and stimulate a new way of thinking.

In the 1970s

Cuba continues in a circle of underdevelopment. The communist Castro government focused on the agricultural development, especially in sugar production, in 1969, which called the Year of the Decisive Effort. The aim was to produce a ten-million-ton sugar harvest in 1970, which it failed to achieve. Due to the sugar production project, the government tightened the control on subsidizing the ICAIC. Therefore, Cuba cinema entered a "gray period" in the 1970s. ICAIC suffered many problems such as limited financial and technical resources. The number of audiences who are willing to go to the theaters decreased due to the growth of the television in the 1970s. Comparing to the very productive period of the 1960s, an overall decline in quality exists in the 1970s.   During that decade, some of the young directors trained abroad returned to Cuba and contributed to the Cuban film industry after training. Although the films were not extraordinary, it helped maintain the Cuban film industry. In 1979, ICAIC establishes International Festival of the New Latin American in Havana. This festival is to celebrate the Latin American cinema by gather outstanding directors, producers and people who contributes to Latin American's film industry. Moreover, it is to bring world attention to cinema from Cuba and the rest of Latin America.

In the 1980s
Cuba in the 1980s had not fully escaped the economic legacy of its past. Despite of the economic influence, the passion of the ICAIC on education through cinema did not decline. ICAIC started working on international coproduction with Spain and the Soviet Union. During the 1980s, ICAIC has changed the organization structure and formed a separate office only for exhibition and associated activities for educating people. Also, the Escuela International de Cine y Televisión (International School of Film and Television) got founded by the ICAIC in 1986. Active directors, editors, producers, sound technicians, and other experts from around the world have been invited to this school to share their experience. EICTV helps the way for new modes of producing and distributing films, which prepares elites for new generation. Those changes point out that the ICAIC is devoted to educate people and draw people’s attention by organizing activities.

The "Special Period" (1990–1995)

The collapse of the Soviet Union put Cuba into a crisis because the United States embargo of Cuba had resulted in heavy Cuban reliance on trading partners in COMECON, which dissolved in 1991. People in Cuba suffered from daily shortages such as electricity blackouts, severe gasoline rationing, huge cuts in public transportation, and bicycles from China. Filmmakers, artists and intellectuals suffered the same consequence as everyone else. ICAIC only completed three features in 1990. At 1991, due to the economic crisis, it also led people to escape the island.

The consequence of the “Special Period" of the 1990s for Cuban cinema is drastic reduction in the resources from film production to distribution. As a result, the ICAIC engaged in co-production with other countries such as Spain, (Germany) and Mexico. Fresa y chocolate (Strawberry and Chocolate) is one of the significant movies co-produced with Spain during the Special Period. More than that, it helps maintain Cuban films internationally and expand the Spanish-language film market.

During this period, co-productions between ICAIC and the United States provided opportunities for civic engagement. For example, the United States Department of State collaborated with ICAIC in 1998 to screen Amistad as part of an effort to increase "cultural diplomacy" built around shared national histories of racial struggles.

Recent years in Cuban cinema
ICAIC continues to make efforts to develop the Cuban film industry and celebrated its 60th anniversary in 2019.

See also 
 Cinema of Cuba
 List of Cuban films

References

External links 

 Cubacine, ICAIC portal
 Instituto Cubano del Arte e Industria Cinematográficos in IMDb
 
 Instituto Cubano del Arte e Industria Cinematográficos in Ecured

Film organizations in Cuba